FC Admira Wacker Mödling are an Austrian football club which are based in Mödling. During the 2014/15 campaign they will be competing in the Austrian Bundesliga and Austrian Cup.

Competitions

Austrian Bundesliga

Austrian Cup

References

Austrian football clubs 2014–15 season
FC Admira Wacker Mödling seasons